Isabella "Belle"  Electa Kellogg Towne (June 1, 1844–1923) was an author and journalist born in Sylvania, Wisconsin. In the 1880s, Belle Kellogg Towne was charged with coordinating and organizing young people's papers for the Young People's Weekly, published by the Chicago-based David C. Cook Publishing Company.

The Weekly, was one of the most notable periodicals of religious papers for the young. Kellogg earned the reputation as being '"one of America's first leading women in the literary and publishing fields.'"

Personal life
Belle Kellogg was born to Seth H. and Electa S. Kellogg. She married doctor, and musical composer Professor Thomas Martin Towne (1835-1912), of Chicago, Illinois. She died in 1923 and is buried with her husband and son, Walter Washburn Towne (1868-1941), at Rosehill Cemetery, Chicago.

Works
 Around the Ranch, D. Lothrop & Company, ©1883
The Transformation of Job, and the Taking in of Martha Matilda, with Frederick Vining Fisher, Dodo Press, 2008, originally published in1900
 On the Mountain Top, David C. Cook, 1904
 Snowflakes and Heartaches,  David C. Cook Publishing Company, 1912

References

External links
 

1844 births
1923 deaths
19th-century American women writers
Burials at Rosehill Cemetery
People from Yorkville, Wisconsin
Wikipedia articles incorporating text from A Woman of the Century
20th-century American women writers